(Latin, "one hundred insects") is a 1763 taxonomic work by Carl Linnaeus, and defended as a thesis by Boas Johansson; which of the two men should for taxonomic purposes be credited with its authorship has been the subject of some controversy. It includes descriptions of 102 new insect and crustacean species that had been sent to Linnaeus from British America, Suriname, Java and other locations. Most of the new names included in Centuria Insectorum are still in use, although a few have been sunk into synonymy, and one was the result of a hoax: a common brimstone butterfly with spots painted on was described as the new "species" Papilio ecclipsis.

Publications 

The contents of the work were published twice, under two slightly different titles. Both bear the date June 23, 1763, although the latter was printed later, in September 1763.

Authorship 

Since  was a thesis presented and defended by one of Linnaeus' students, Boas Johansson (1742–1809) from Kalmar, it has been argued that authorship of the taxa named in it should be assigned to Johansson. The authorship, however, has been the subject of some controversy.

Several lines of argument have been used to suggest that Linnaeus should be considered the author. The role of the person defending the thesis at Swedish universities at the time was to prove his command of Latin, and responsibility for the text of the thesis rested mainly, if not entirely, with the professor. Linnaeus appeared to consider himself the author, referring in his later works to  without including an abbreviation for the author, as he did for works written by other people. Works presented by students of other taxonomists of the era (such as Carl Peter Thunberg, Adam Afzelius and Elias Magnus Fries) are generally credited to their supervisors, and not the students themselves. Finally, most zoologists, and "Scandinavian authorities on Linnaeana" consider Linnaeus the author; in the interests of nomenclatural stability, it is preferable to continue doing so. The issue was raised in a petition to the International Commission on Zoological Nomenclature and, although a large majority voted in favour of recognising Linnaeus as the author, the one dissenting vote caused the commission to defer its decision.

Sources 

The specimens used by Linnaeus or Johansson in writing  include some provided by Dr Alexander Garden, a horticulturist from Charles Town in the Province of South Carolina, by Carl Gustav Dahlberg in Suriname, by Hans Johan Nordgren in Java, and from the collection of Baron Charles De Geer from the Province of Pennsylvania.

Contents 

The dissertation begins by discussing improvements that the Linnaean system of taxonomy has brought to the study of insects, before describing the new species.

Brimstone hoax 

This was based on a specimen sent by William Charlton to James Petiver in 1702, who wrote: "It exactly resembles our English Brimstone Butterfly (R. Rhamni), were it not for those black spots and apparent blue moons on the lower wings. This is the only one I have seen." Carl Linnaeus examined the butterfly, and named it Papilio ecclipsis in Centuria Insectorum Rariorum, including it in his  from the 12th edition (1767) onwards. It was not until 1793 that the hoax was discovered by Johan Christian Fabricius, who recognised that the dark patches had been painted on, and that the specimen was a common brimstone butterfly (now called Gonepteryx rhamni). Although the curator at the British Museum "indignantly stamped the specimen to pieces" when he found out, William Jones created two replicas to replace the lost specimen.

Species 

Exceptions are that thrips (Thysanoptera), mantises (Mantodea) and Orthoptera were included in the Hemiptera, dragonflies (Odonata) were included in the Neuroptera, and the section called "Aptera" contains crustaceans rather than insects in the modern sense. Most of the names introduced in Centuria Insectorum are still in use, albeit in different genera; in a few cases, it is not clear what animal the name refers to.

Coleoptera

Hemiptera

Lepidoptera

Neuroptera

Hymenoptera

Diptera

Aptera

Footnotes

References

Further reading 

 (also available at Biodiversity Heritage Library, SUB Göttingen and Google Books)

1763 books
1763 in science
Carl Linnaeus
18th-century Latin books